Poviglio is a comune (municipality) in the Province of Reggio Emilia in the Italian region Emilia-Romagna, located about  northwest of Bologna and about  northwest of Reggio Emilia.

Poviglio borders the following municipalities: Boretto, Brescello, Castelnovo di Sotto, Gattatico.

Twin towns
Poviglio is twinned with:

  Plédran, France

References

Cities and towns in Emilia-Romagna